The 1918 Fareham by-election was held on 18 July 1918.  The by-election was held due to the elevation of the incumbent Conservative MP, Sir Arthur Lee.  It was won by the Conservative candidate John Humphrey Davidson  who was unopposed due to a War-time electoral pact.

References

1918 in England
Politics of the Borough of Fareham
1918 elections in the United Kingdom
By-elections to the Parliament of the United Kingdom in Hampshire constituencies
20th century in Hampshire
Unopposed by-elections to the Parliament of the United Kingdom (need citation)